Raxa is a genus of true bugs in the family Pyrrhocoridae. Unlike most pyrrhocorids, members of this genus are predatory, rather than herbivorous.

References 

Pyrrhocoridae
Pentatomomorpha genera